Strange We Should Meet Here is an album released by electronic rock duo, Idiot Pilot, on May 17, 2005.

Track listing

Personnel
Michael Harris – vocals, producer
Daniel Anderson – vocals, guitar, programmer, bass guitar, keyboard, piano, producer, engineering
Joseph Lipham – drums
Paul Turpin – additional bass guitar, additional Moog, producer, mixing, engineer
Chip Westerfield – producer, engineer
Dave Richards – producer

References

Idiot Pilot albums
2005 debut albums
Reprise Records albums